The 1948 Maryland State Raiders football team was an American football team that represented Maryland State College (now known as University of Maryland Eastern Shore) during the 1948 college football season. In its first season under head coach Vernon McCain, the team compiled an 7–1 record.

Key players included freshman halfback Sylvester Polk. Polk scored five touchdowns on seven running attempts against Morris College and ranked among the nation's scoring leaders in 1947.

The 1948 season was the school's first under the common name Maryland State College. It was officially known as the University of Maryland's College for Negroes at Princess Anne and had previously been known as Maryland's Agricultural and Mechanical College for Negroes, though it had been commonly referred to as Princess Anne College. In 1948, the school's president, Dr. J. T. Williams, discarded the "Princess Anne College" name because "people thought it might be a girl's finishing school . . . it embarrassed the football team."

Schedule

References

Maryland State
Maryland Eastern Shore Hawks football seasons
Maryland State Raiders football